Black Mountain, also known as Galambary to the Ngunnawal people, is a small mountain with an elevation of   that is situated to the west of the Canberra central business district on the northern shore of Lake Burley Griffin, in the Australian Capital Territory of Australia. Black Mountain is protected from development by the Canberra Nature Park and is predominantly covered in native bushland and is a haven to native wildlife.

Location and features
The mountain is located west of the main campus of the Australian National University and, together with the  ridge, forms a natural west and northwestern boundary for Canberra city.

The Australian National Botanic Gardens and the CSIRO share the eastern base of Black Mountain, next to the Australian National University.

Black Mountain was originally named Black Hill at the same time as the naming of nearby Red Hill. The original name explains why the mountain is not named Mount Black, like nearby Mount Majura and Mount Ainslie. The early European settlers referred to the mountain formation as the Canberry Ranges.

Geology

The bulk of Black Mountain consists of the white quartz Black Mountain Sandstone.  This was deposited in the late Early Silurian age.  On the south east slopes and north west there are exposures of State Circle shale. The Black Mountain Peninsula contains mudstone in the north and greywacke from the Ordovician age Pittman Formation in the south.

References

External links

Parks in Canberra
Mountains of the Australian Capital Territory
Silurian volcanism